The Frenchglen Hotel State Heritage Site is a hotel in the sparsely populated southeast part of Oregon, United States. It is located in the small village of Frenchglen, near the base of Steens Mountain and at the northern end of the loop road that ascends almost to the mountain's summit above .

The hotel was built in 1924. In its early days, its guests typically had business at Peter French's P Ranch or were visiting the Malheur National Wildlife Refuge. From 1937 to 1938, the hotel was restored and enlarged by the U.S. Bureau of Sport Fisheries and Wildlife, with labor from the Civilian Conservation Corps.

The Oregon Parks and Recreation Department took possession of the property in 1973. The site was added to the National Register of Historic Places in 1984.

Today, the historic hotel building has eight guest rooms, and an additional modern building, the Drovers' Inn, accommodates overflow guests. It also has a dining room.  Guests still visit for the wildlife refuge, as well as nearby Steens Mountain.

References

External links 

 Official web site

State parks of Oregon
Buildings and structures in Harney County, Oregon
Hotel buildings on the National Register of Historic Places in Oregon
Tourist attractions in Harney County, Oregon
National Register of Historic Places in Harney County, Oregon
1924 establishments in Oregon